Josep Antoni Gayá Martínez (born 7 July 2000) is a Spanish professional footballer who plays as a central defender for RCD Mallorca.

Club career
Born in Palma de Mallorca, Balearic Islands, Gayá joined RCD Mallorca's youth setup in June 2016, from CD Manacor. He made his senior debut with the reserves on 1 May 2019, coming on as a second-half substitute in a 6–0 Tercera División away routing of CF Sóller.

Gayá scored his first senior goal on 13 December 2020, netting the equalizer for the B's in a 1–1 draw at SD Formentera. He made his first team – and La Liga – debut the following 22 September, starting in a 1–6 away loss against Real Madrid.

References

External links
 
 

2000 births
Living people
Footballers from Palma de Mallorca
Spanish footballers
Association football defenders
La Liga players
Segunda Federación players
Tercera División players
Tercera Federación players
RCD Mallorca B players
RCD Mallorca players